Hermynia Zur Mühlen (12 December 1883 – 20 March 1951), or Folliot de Crenneville-Poutet, was an Austrian writer and translator. She translated over seventy books into German from English, Russian and French, including work by Upton Sinclair, John Galsworthy, Jerome K. Jerome, Harold Nicolson, Max Eastman and Edna Ferber. She has been characterised as "one of the best known women writers of the Weimar Republic." A committed socialist from a Viennese aristocratic Catholic family, she was sometimes called the Red Countess.

Life
The Countess Folliot de Crenneville, born as Hermine Isabelle Maria Gräfin Folliot de Crenneville in Vienna, was the great granddaughter of Louis Charles Folliot de Crenneville, a French-born general who fought for the Habsburg monarchy in the Napoleonic Wars. Her paternal grandfather was Franz Folliot de Crenneville, Knight in the Order of the Golden Fleece. Her maternal grandfather was the diplomat Ferdinand, Count von Wydenbruck, who had married a politically liberal woman from the Anglo-Irish gentry. Growing up in the Governorate of Estonia, where her father was a diplomat, she was sent aged 30 to a pulmonary sanatorium in Davos. Here she began a career of translation into German, translating an anti-war novel by Leonid Andreyev, and in 1918 King Coal by Upton Sinclair. An unhappy marriage to Viktor von zur Mühlen, a conservative German landowner, was officially ended in 1923. By this time she had met Stefan Klein, a German Jew and fellow translator who would be her partner for the rest of her life.

Zur Mühlen wrote six detective novels under the name Lawrence H. Desberry, and collections of fairy tales interpreted from a radical perspective. She also wrote anecdotes, sketches and feuilletons for periodical publication. She published an autobiographical memoir, End und Anfang, in 1929, in which the new beginning is that of the Russian Revolution. Though she quietly left the Communist Party around 1931 or 1932, she remained committed to socialism.

Zur Mühlen and Klein left Germany for Vienna in 1933. Zur Mühlen refused to agree to S. Fischer Verlag's appeal that she follow Thomas Mann, Alfred Döblin, René Schickele and Stefan Klein in undertaking not to write in émigré magazines:

Unsere Töchter die Nazinen was a directly anti-Nazi satire: serialized in the Territory of the Saar Basin in a leftwing newspaper in 1934, it was banned after eventually finding a publisher in 1936. With the Anschluss of  1938, Zur Mühlen and Klein left for Bratislava, where they married. 
After the German occupation of Bohemia in March 1939, they had to escape again; via Budapest, Yugoslavia, Italy, Switzerland and France, they reached London on 19 June 1939.
In London, Zur Mühlen scraped a precarious living from journalism. The two novels she wrote in England - Ewiges Schattenspiel and Als der Fremde kam - seem to have been part of an intended trilogy. She died in obscurity in Radlett, Hertfordshire.

Works 
 Schupomann Karl Müller (1924)
 Fairy tales for workers' children Chicago, Ill., Daily Worker Pub. Co. 1925
 Unsere Töchter, die Nazinnen Our Daughters, the Nazis (1935). "Unsere Töchter die Nazinen." A Synopsis in English, With an Introduction. By Lionel Gossman, Princeton University.
 We Poor Shadows (1943)
 Came the Stranger (1946)
 The Castle of Truth and Other Revolutionary Tales (Princeton, 2020), ed. and trans. by Jack Zipes

References

Sources
 Bloomsbury Guide to Women's Literature
 Lionel Gossman, "The Red Countess: Four Stories," Common Knowledge, vol. 15 (2009), 59-91.
 Ailsa Wallace, Hermynia Zur Muhlen: The Guises of Socialist Fiction (Oxford University Press, 2009)
 Manfred Altner, Hermynia Zur Muhlen; Eine Biographie, (Bern: Peter Lang, 1997)
Barbara McCloskey, "Teach Your Children Well: Hermynia Zur Mühlen, George Grosz, and the Art of Radical Pedagogy in Germany between the World Wars." In Art and Resistance in Germany, edited by Deborah Ascher Barnstone and Elizabeth Otto. (New York: Bloomsbury Visual Arts, 2018), p. 77-95.

External links 

 
 
 
 
 Liebe Genossin: Hermynia Zur Mühlen: a Writer of Courage and Conviction by Lionel Gossman
 Lionel Grossman,  The End and the Beginning: a Memoir. Cambridge, UK: Open Book Publishers, 2010. DOI: https://doi.org/10.11647/OBP.0007

1883 births
1951 deaths
Political writers
Austrian women novelists
Austrian translators
Translators from Russian
English–German translators
Austrian socialists
Austrian countesses
Austrian people of French descent
Austrian expatriates in Germany
Austrian fantasy writers
Austrian expatriates in England
Writers from Vienna
Pseudonymous women writers
20th-century Austrian novelists
20th-century Austrian women writers
20th-century translators
Women political writers
20th-century pseudonymous writers